Rail is a British magazine on the subject of current rail transport in Great Britain. It is published every two weeks by Bauer Consumer Media and can be bought from the travel sections of UK newsstands. It is targeted primarily at the enthusiast market, but also covers issues relating to rail transport.

Rail is more than four decades old, and was called Rail Enthusiast from its launch in 1981 until 1988. It is one of only two railway magazines that increased its circulation. It has roughly the same cover design for several years, with a capitalised italic red RAIL along the top of the front cover.

Editorial policy

Rail is customarily critical of railway institutions, including the Rail Delivery Group, the Office of Rail and Road, as well as, since it assumed greater railway powers, the Department for Transport. Rail's continuing campaigns include one against advertising and media images showing celebrities and others walking between the rails (an unsafe practice), with another against weeds on railway lines.

The market for rail magazines has remained static but bounced back since then. To meet the change in the market, the magazine has repositioned itself from being purely enthusiast-based to being more business-oriented. This has met with some success.

Rail also organises conferences, including the annual National Rail Conference, the National Rail Awards and the Rail 100 Breakfast Club.

Regular features and contributors

Rail publishes a mix of news, analysis and features written by its own editorial staff and freelance contributors.

The magazine takes a broadly supportive stance on High Speed 2 and began running a regular column dedicated to it in 2013.

The magazine's Managing Editor is Nigel Harris. Other staff include Deputy Editor Stefanie Foster, News Editor Paul Stephen and Features Editor Tom Allett.

Other regular contributors include transport commentator Christian Wolmar, one of the most vociferous critics of the privatisation of railways in Britain; fares and ticketing expert Barry Doe (The Fare Dealer); an anonymous railway employee, the Industry Insider, as well as Steve Broadbent, Andy Coward and Chris Leigh.

Many of Rail's editorial staff frequently appear on television and radio when a rail expert is needed to comment on a story.

Columns
 Comment
 Industry Insider
 Christian Wolmar
 The Fare Dealer
 Stop & Examine

See also
 List of rail transport-related periodicals
 Modern Railways
 Railways Illustrated
 The Railway Magazine
 Today's Railways UK

References

External links

Bauer Group (UK)
Biweekly magazines published in the United Kingdom
Magazines established in 1981
Rail transport magazines published in the United Kingdom
1981 establishments in England
Mass media in Peterborough